{{DISPLAYTITLE:C21H26N2O3}}
The molecular formula C21H26N2O3 may refer to:

 Corynanthine
 Dregamine
 Rauwolscine
 Rhazine
 Stemmadenine
 Tabernaemontanine
 Vincamine
 Yohimbine